Aulonocara rostratum is a species of haplochromine cichlid. It is endemic to Lake Malawi where it is found in Malawi and Tanzania. It is found throughout the lake. The males gather in loose aggregations in sandy areas, defending small territories which they defend from other males.

References

rostratum
Taxa named by Ethelwynn Trewavas
Fish described in 1935
Taxonomy articles created by Polbot